Whitwell may refer to:

Places
UK
Whitwell, Derbyshire
Whitwell Common, Derbyshire
Whitwell, Hertfordshire
Whitwell, Isle of Wight
Whitwell & Reepham railway station, Norfolk
Whitwell, North Yorkshire, near Catterick
Whitwell, Rutland
Whitwell-on-the-Hill, in between York and Malton
Whitwell House, County Durham

USA
Whitwell, Tennessee

People
 Allan Whitwell (born 1954),  English Olympic rower
 John Whitwell (1812–1880), English Liberal politician
 Field Marshal John Griffin Whitwell, 4th Baron Howard de Walden (1719–1797), British nobleman and soldier
 Joseph Whitwell (1869–1932), English amateur first-class cricketer
 Mike Whitwell, American football player
 Philip Whitwell Wilson (1875–1956), British Liberal politician, writer and journalist
 R. J. Whitwell (1859–1928), British medievalist
 Sally Whitwell (born 1974), Australian pianist
 Thomas Stedman Whitwell (1784–1840), English architect
 William Whitwell (1867–1942), English amateur first-class cricketer